This is a list of queens of Jerusalem, from 1099 to 1291.

Throughout 200 years of its existence, the Kingdom of Jerusalem had one protector, 18 kings (including 7 jure uxoris) and five queens regnant. Six women were queens consort, i.e. queens as wives of the kings. Some of them were highly influential in the country's history, having ruled as regents for their minor children and heirs, as well as having a great influence over their spouses. Many kings of Jerusalem died unmarried or as children.

Queens of Jerusalem

Reigning Queens
This is a list of queens regnant of Jerusalem who held to the throne by their own right:''

Consorts

House of Boulogne, 1099–1118

House of Rethel, 1118–1153

House of Anjou, 1143–1205

House of Aleramici, 1205–1212NoneHouse of Brienne, 1212–1228None'

House of Hohenstaufen, 1228–1268

House of Lusignan, 1268–1291

See also
Kings of Jerusalem
List of Queens of Cyprus
List of Queens of Armenia
List of Savoyard consorts
List of Neapolitan consorts
Princess of Antioch
List of Latin Empresses

Notes 

Jerusalem
 
Queens regnant of Jerusalem
Queens